The Blue Line is a light rail line in the Sacramento Regional Transit District (RT) system.  It runs primarily north–south in Sacramento between Watt/I-80 and Cosumnes River College.  Along the route, the Blue Line serves North Highlands, North Sacramento, Downtown and South Sacramento.  Portions of the Blue Line run along the original initial alignment between Watt/I-80 and 16th Street stations.

Line description
The Blue Line begins at its northern terminus, the Watt/I-80 station.  From there it initially travels southwest in the median of I-80, utilizing a bridge from an abandoned freeway project, then parallels Roseville Road before turning westward paralleling Arden Way in North Sacramento.  (It passes up the Siemens plant nearby.)  Then the line turns southwest again running in the median of Del Paso Boulevard, merges into a single track crossing the 12th Street viaduct (Highway 160) over the American River.  Reaching downtown, the Blue Line goes back to two tracks going south on 12th, turns west on K Street, and splits into one-way tracks for 7th and 8th Streets where it joins the Gold and Green Lines.  It then turns westward on O Street, southward on 12th, then eastward in an alley paralleling Q and R Streets.  After passing the 16th Street station, the Blue Line splits from the Gold Line (the Green Line terminates at 13th Street station), crossing under the Bee Bridge before going south in its own right-of-way into South Sacramento.  It then jogs eastward along Cosumnes River Boulevard before crossing it and reaching its southern terminus at Cosumnes River College station.

History
The first light rail line of the RT opened March 12, 1987.  Initial service commenced between Watt/I-80 and 8th & O stations only for the first six months. It was extended to Butterfield that same year on September 5.  In all, it was an  route between Watt/I-80 station in North Sacramento, through downtown, and continuing east on Folsom Blvd. to Butterfield Way station. It was built at a cost of $176 million USD ($ adjusted for inflation), which included the cost of vehicles and maintenance and storage facilities. Much of the line, when it was first built, was single-tracked, though improvements over the 1990s allowed much of the original system to be double-tracked. The line was built mainly using portions of the Sacramento Northern Railroad and Sacramento Valley Railroad right-of-ways, coupled with use of structures of an abandoned freeway project. A limited portion of the route runs on streets, mainly in downtown Sacramento.

The line became more popular than anyone anticipated, necessitating further expansions and improvements to the system.

The first phase of the southern extension opened on September 26, 2003, with  added from 16th Street station to Meadowview Road. The extension added seven new stations to the system and runs parallel to a railroad right-of-way. The light rail system was reconfigured in June 2005 with the South Line connected to the Watt I-80/Downtown Line and designated as the Blue Line.

The second phase of the southern extension opened more than a decade later on August 24, 2015, with  added from Meadowview Road to Cosumnes River College. The extension added seven new stations to the system. A fourth station, Morrison Creek, will open as an infill station after the adjacent land had been developed. Sacramento RT added a large parking structure at Cosumnes River College to attract riders from southern Sacramento County and boost ridership.

A third planned phase which would extend the line from its current southern terminus to Elk Grove about 2 miles along Bruceville Road is on hold indefinitely due to a lack of funding. Land use and station accessibility must be improved to qualify the extension for Federal Transit Administration (FTA) grant funding. Currently construction on this project is not expected to begin until after 2040.

An additional infill station on the line called Dos Rios station is planned between the Globe and Alkali Flat/La Valentina stations in the Dos Rios Triangle neighborhood of North Sacramento. The station is planned as part of a new housing development project that is funded by California's cap and trade system, with an opening date set for around 2023.

Station listing 
The following table lists the current stations of the Blue Line, from north to south.

References

External links

RT Light Rail map
Blue Line schedule

Sacramento Regional Transit District
Transportation in Sacramento, California
Public transportation in Sacramento County, California
Passenger rail transportation in California
Light rail in California
Railway lines opened in 1987
Railway lines in highway medians
1987 establishments in California
750 V DC railway electrification